Moor Park is a  biological Site of Special Scientific Interest east of Farnham in Surrey.

This site in the valley of the River Wey is mainly alder carr, which is a nationally rare habitat. It is dominated by alder, with some crack willow. An area of swamp is mainly covered by common reed, with other plants including  water-plantain, marsh violet, opposite leaved golden-saxifrage and hemlock water-dropwort.

The site is part of the grounds of Moor Park, Farnham, a listed building. The Greensand Way footpath runs through the site.

References

Sites of Special Scientific Interest in Surrey